Lee Stratford Barnes (July 16, 1906 – December 28, 1970) was an American athlete from Utah who competed in the men's pole vault. He was born in Salt Lake City, Utah and died in Oxnard, California.

Barnes attended the University of Southern California in Los Angeles. He competed in Athletics at the 1924 Summer Olympics in Paris and won gold, beating fellow American polevaulter Glen Graham, who received silver.

Barnes has the honor of being the only known stunt double for silent film star Buster Keaton during Keaton's independent years of film making. In Keaton's 1927 feature College, Barnes performed a pole vault through an open upper-story window.

References

External links

1906 births
1970 deaths
Track and field athletes from Salt Lake City
American male pole vaulters
Athletes (track and field) at the 1924 Summer Olympics
Athletes (track and field) at the 1928 Summer Olympics
Olympic gold medalists for the United States in track and field
World record setters in athletics (track and field)
University of Southern California alumni
USC Trojans men's track and field athletes
Medalists at the 1924 Summer Olympics